Kanwar may refer to:


People

Surname
 Amar Kanwar (born 1964), Indian artist
 Anita Kanwar, Indian actor
 Indira Kanwar (c. 1696 – 1793), Mughal empress
 Narendra Kanwar, Indian politician
 Raj Kanwar (c. 1961 – 2012), Indian film director
 Ranbir Singh Kanwar (1930–2005), Indian agronomist
 Roop Kanwar (c. 1969 – 1987), Indian woman notable for committing sati
 Sarul Kanwar (born 1987), Indian cricketer

Given name
 Kanwar Bahadur Singh (1910–2007), a senior officer in the Indian Army

Other uses
 Kanwar (tribe), a community found in the Indian states of Chhattisgarh, Jharkhand and Odisha
 Kunwar family (or Kanwar family), a noble Chhetri family in the Gorkha Kingdom and the Kingdom of Nepal
 Kanwar Sanctuary, Kullu district, Himachal Pradesh, India